Wilfried Seyferth (21 April 1908 – 9 October 1954) was a German actor, perhaps best known for Decision Before Dawn.

He was married four times, to four actresses, Eva Ingeborg Scholz, Tatjana Iwanow, Irene Naef and Lu Säuberlich. He died in a traffic accident on 9 October 1954 in Wiesbaden, Hesse.

Partial filmography

 Tugboat M 17 (1933) - Jakob
 Under Blazing Heavens (1936) - Pop, Matrose
 Einmal werd' ich Dir gefallen (1938) - Rettich - sein Freund
 Skandal um den Hahn (1938) - Franz Langmann
 Der Tag nach der Scheidung (1938) - Max Pleschke, Angestellter bei Romberg
 By a Silken Thread (1938) - Verkäufer der Firma Hellwerth
 In the Name of the People (1939) - Sohn des bayerischen Holzschnitzers
 Salonwagen E 417 (1939) - Willy Fetthenne
 The Star of Rio (1940) - Journalist, Assistent von Herrn Hadrian
 Der Kleinstadtpoet (1940) - Emil Kurz, Friseur
 The Swedish Nightingale (1941) - Hofjunker (China-Märchen)
 Destiny (1942) - Junger Kellner
 Rembrandt (1942) - Ulricus Vischer
 Meine Freundin Josefine (1942) - Diener Oscar
 My Wife Theresa (1942) - Maler
 Die Wirtin zum Weißen Röß'l (1943) - Otto
 The Bath in the Barn (1943) - Jan, Amtsgehilfe
 Immensee (1943) - Werner, Musikstudent
 Leuchtende Schatten (1945)
 Der Fall Molander (1945)
 Ghost in the Castle (1947) - Willi Busse
 This Man Belongs to Me (1950) - Paul Fänger
 Everything for the Company (1950) - Peter Immermann
 When a Woman Loves (1950) - Konsul Brenkow
 Das seltsame Leben des Herrn Bruggs (1951) - Tonani - Konzert-Agent
 Decision Before Dawn (1951) - Heinz Scholtz - SS Man
 Toxi (1952) - Theodor Jenrich
 The Devil Makes Three (1952) - Hansig
 Homesick for You (1952) - Vicky Hanke
 The Merry Vineyard (1952) - Gustav Knuzius
 Mask in Blue (1953) - Orgando, Manager
 Dutch Girl (1953) - Quietsch
 A Musical War of Love (1953) - Generaldirektor Rabenfuß
 Southern Nights (1953) - Zaccarella
 The Dancing Heart (1953) - Leopold
 The Charming Young Lady (1953) - Felix Bernard
 Men at a Dangerous Age (1954) - Adam Kassner (Dichter)
 The Man of My Life (1954) - Dr. Nörenberg
 Roses from the South (1954) - Pierre
 A House Full of Love (1954) - Remming
 Ein toller Tag (1954) - Basilio, music teacher
 08/15 (1954) - Major Luschke
 Hoheit lassen bitten (1954) - Landrat von Wahlegg
 The Golden Plague (1954) - Wenzeslaw Kolowrat
 Secrets of the City (1955) - Ein Fremder (final film role)

References

External links
 

1908 births
1954 deaths
German male film actors
20th-century German male actors
Actors from Darmstadt
Road incident deaths in Germany